The Linksys WRT54G Wi-Fi series is a series of Wi-Fi–capable residential gateways marketed by Linksys, a subsidiary of Cisco, from 2003 until acquired by Belkin in 2013. A residential gateway connects a local area network (such as a home network) to a wide area network (such as the Internet).

Models in this series use one of various 32-bit MIPS processors. All WRT54G models support Fast Ethernet for wired data links, and 802.11b/g for wireless data links.

Hardware and revisions

WRT54G 

The original WRT54G was first released in December 2002. It has a 4+1 port network switch (the Internet/WAN port is part of the same internal network switch, but on a different VLAN). The devices have two removable antennas connected through Reverse Polarity TNC connectors. The WRT54GC router is an exception and has an internal antenna with optional external antenna.

As a cost-cutting measure, as well as to satisfy FCC rules that prohibit fitting external antennas with higher gain, the design of the latest version of the WRT54G no longer has detachable antennas or TNC connectors. Instead, version 8 routers simply route thin wires into antenna 'shells' eliminating the connector. As a result, Linksys HGA7T and similar external antennas are no longer compatible with this model.

Until version 5, WRT54G shipped with Linux-based firmware.

WRT54GS 

The WRT54GS is nearly identical to the WRT54G except for additional RAM, flash memory, and SpeedBooster software. Versions 1 to 3 of this router have 8 MB of flash memory. Since most third parties' firmware only use up to 4 MB flash, a JFFS2-based read/write filesystem can be created and used on the remaining 4 MB free flash. This allows for greater flexibility of configurations and scripting, enabling this small router to both load-balance multiple ADSL lines (multi-homed) or to be run as a hardware layer-2 load balancer (with appropriate third party firmware).

WRT54GL 

Linksys released the WRT54GL (the best-selling router of all time) in 2005 to support third-party firmware based on Linux, after the original WRT54G line was switched from Linux to VxWorks, starting with version 5. The WRT54GL is technically a reissue of the version 4 WRT54G. Cisco was sued by the FSF for copyright infringement, but the case was settled.

WRTSL54GS 
WRTSL54GS is similar to the WRT54GS while adding additional firmware features and a USB 2.0 port (referred to as StorageLink) which can be used for a USB hard disk or flash drive.

Unlike other models, the WRTSL54GS has only a single 1.5 dBi antenna, and it is not removable.

WRT54GX 

WRT54GX comes with SRX (Speed and Range eXpansion), which uses "True MIMO" technology. It has three antennas and was once marketed as a "Pre-N" router, with eight times the speed and three times the range over standard 802.11g routers.

WRT54GP2 and WRTP54G 
WRT54GP2 has 1 or 2 antennas, and a built-in analog telephony adapter (ATA) with 2 phone lines, but only 3 network ports.
"Vonage" WRTP54G has 1 antenna, 2 phone lines, 4 network ports — Same S/N Prefix

WRT54GX2 
WRT54GX2 has 2 antennas, and was advertised to have up to 6 times the speed and 2 times the range over standard 802.11g routers. Chipset Realtek. It is not compatible with DD-WRT.

WRT54GX4 
WRT54GX4 has 3 moveable antennas, and is advertised to have 10 times the speed and 3 times the range of standard 802.11g routers.
WRT54GX4-EU: chipset Realtek RTL8651B, radio chipset Airgo AGN303BB, flash S29GL064M90TFIR4. It does not appear to be compatible with DD-WRT.

WRT51AB 
WRT series with 802.11a support. (First Generation)

WRT55AG 
WRT54G series with 802.11a support.

WTR54GS 
The Linksys WTR54GS is a confusingly named derivative of the WRT54G. It is a compact wireless travel router with SpeedBooster support that has only one LAN and one WAN Fast Ethernet interfaces, but has two wireless interfaces. The WTR54GS has the ability to make an unencrypted wireless connection on one interface, and make open shared connections on the other wireless interface, or the LAN port.

WRT54G2 

The WRT54G2 is an iteration of the WRT54G in a smaller, curved black case with internal antenna(s). This unit includes a four port 10/100 switch and one WAN port.

* Note: 1.5 of the WRT54G2 is NOT supported by dd-wrt.  This is because it uses Atheros components (i.e. the Atheros SoC) which require more than the 2 MB of Flash Memory built-in for a dd-wrt solution.

WRT54GS2 
The WRT54GS2 is the WRT54G2 hardware with the VxWorks 5.5 Firmware including SpeedBooster. It has a sleek black design with 2 internal antennas. It includes a 4-port 10/100 switch and one 10/100 WAN port on the rear.

WRT54GC 

WRT54GC series with 802.11b/g support. This unit has a four port 10/100 switch and one WAN port.  The "C" in the router number stands for compact, as the unit measures 4" by 4" by 1" with an internal antenna.  The unit can be expanded with addition of HGA7S external antenna to boost range. Hardware Version 1.0 is the only option available in the United States since introduction in 2005.

Version 2.0 is shipping in, amongst other countries, the United Kingdom. This unit has 1 MB flash, 4 MB RAM and a non-detachable external antenna.

The internal hardware is based on a Marvell ARM914 ("Libertas") reference design which is probably identical to the SerComm IP806SM, Xterasys XR-2407G, Abocom ARM914, Hawking HWGR54 Revision M, and the Airlink 101 AR315W.  By appropriately changing the value of the firmware byte 0x26, the WRT54GC can be cross-flashed with firmware based on the same reference platform.

There were reports in 2006 that a sister platform of the WRT54GC (the AR315W) was hacked to run Linux.

WRT54G3G/WRT54G3GV2 Mobile Broadband router 
The WRT54G3G/WRT54G3GV2 Mobile Broadband routers are variants that have four Fast Ethernet ports, one Internet wired port (For DSL/Cable connections), plus a PCMCIA slot for use with a Cellular Based PC Card "aircard". The V2 model has two additional USB ports for 3G modem use and one other USB port, which has yet to be put to use.

Other cellular providers
To use this router with other cellular providers, one must use an alternative firmware.  The stock firmware does not support cellular providers, even though one does have the exact supported aircard.  For example, Telus Mobility (CANADA) uses the Sierra Wireless Aircard 595, which is supported by this router, but because it is from Telus Mobility and not from Sprint (USA), it will never load the card into the router to make it operational. This is only true for the Sprint and AT&T-branded models.

WRT54G-TM, WRTU54G-TM, and WRTU54GV2-TM 

The WRT54G-TM (TM stands for T-Mobile) is also called the T-Mobile "Hotspot@Home" service.  It allows calls to be made via T-Mobile's GSM network or via Wi-Fi Unlicensed Mobile Access (UMA), using the same telephone and phone number (a special dual-mode phone designed for the service is required e.g. BlackBerry Pearl 8120). Additionally, once a call is in progress, one may transition from Wi-Fi to GSM (and vice versa) seamlessly, as Wi-Fi signal comes and goes, such as when entering or exiting a home or business. A special router is not needed to use the service, but the T-Mobile branded routers are supposed to enhance the telephone's battery life. This is the only known tweak to the TM version of the firmware. The hardware appears similar to that of the WRT54GL, except it has 32 MB RAM and 8 MB flash memory.

The WRT54G-TM having a serial number that starts with C061 has these specifications:
 Broadcom BCM5352EKPBG CPU
32 MB RAM (Hynix HY5DU561622ETP-D43)
8 MB Flash (JS28f640)
Uses the same BINs that the WRT54GS v3.0 does

WRT54G-RG 
The WRT54G-RG (RG stands for Rogers) is also called the Rogers TalkSpot Voice-Optimized Router. It works with Rogers' Talkspot UMA service, which allows calls to be made via Rogers' cellular network or via Wi-Fi Unlicensed Mobile Access (UMA), using the same telephone and phone number. A UMA-compatible phone is required. The WRT54G-RG and the WRT54G-TM are identical in terms of hardware.

WRT54GH 

The WRT54GH comes with an internal antenna, a four-port network switch, and support for Wi-Fi 802.11b/g.

Third-party firmware projects 

After Linksys was obliged to release source code of the WRT54G's firmware under terms of the GNU General Public License, there have been many third party projects enhancing that code as well as some entirely new projects using the hardware in these devices.  Three of the most widely used are DD-WRT, Tomato and OpenWrt.

Hardware versions and firmware compatibility 
As of January 2006, most third-party firmware are no longer compatible with version 5 of both the WRT54G and the WRT54GS.  The amount of flash memory in the version 5 devices has been reduced to 2 MB, too small for current Linux-based third-party firmware.  (See table above for information on identifying the version based on the serial number printed on the bottom of the unit, and on the outside of the shrink-wrapped retail box.)

Some users have succeeded in flashing and running a stripped down but fully functional version of DD-WRT called 'micro' on a version 5 WRT54G. An easier method not requiring any disassembly of the device has since been devised for flashing v5-v8 to DD-WRT.

To support third-party firmware, Linksys has re-released the WRT54G v4, under the new model name WRT54GL (the 'L' in this name allegedly stands for 'Linux'). It is also possible to replace the 2 MB flash chip in the WRT54G with a 4 MB flash chip. The Macronix International 29LV320BTC-90 is a suitable part although others may work as well. The user must first install a JTAG header and use a JTAG cable to back up the firmware, then replace the chip and restore the firmware with the JTAG cable. After testing for proper functionality of the modified unit, third-party firmware can be flashed using the JTAG cable and a suitable image file.

With the Attitude Adjustment (12.09) release of OpenWrt, all WRT54G hardware versions with 16 MB of RAM are no longer supported, and older Backfire (10.03) is recommended instead.  Issues came from dropping support for the legacy Broadcom target brcm-2.4, making lower end devices run out of memory easily.  Support for Attitude Adjustment is limited to WRT54G hardware versions with 32 MB of RAM, which includes WRT54GS and (apart from performing RAM upgrades through hardware modifications) some of the WRT54G and WRT54GL versions having the capability for unlocking their additional 16 MB of RAM.

See also 

 Linksys routers

References

Further reading

External links 

 Linksys website

Wireless networking hardware
Hardware routers
Linux-based devices
Linksys